The Rwandan Red Cross, also known as RRC, was founded in 1964. It has its headquarters in Kigali.

External links
Official website
Rwandan Red Cross Profile

Red Cross and Red Crescent national societies
1964 establishments in Rwanda
Organizations established in 1964
Medical and health organisations based in Rwanda